Michal Borovanský (born March 15, 1985) is a Czech professional ice hockey right winger.

Borovanský played 36 games in the Czech Extraliga for HC Karlovy Vary and HC Slavia Praha. He also played thirteen games for TKH Toruń in the Polska Liga Hokejowa.

Borovanský played for the Czech Republic in the 2005 World Junior Ice Hockey Championships.

References

External links

1985 births
Living people
HC Berounští Medvědi players
Bisons de Neuilly-sur-Marne players
Czech ice hockey right wingers
BK Havlíčkův Brod players
Indiana Ice players
HC Karlovy Vary players
HC Kobra Praha players
HC Most players
HC Slavia Praha players
Ice hockey people from Prague
TKH Toruń players
Czech expatriate ice hockey players in Germany
Czech expatriate ice hockey players in the United States
Czech expatriate sportspeople in France
Czech expatriate sportspeople in Poland
Expatriate ice hockey players in France
Expatriate ice hockey players in Poland